Anthony Thomas Aquinas Carmona  (born 7 March 1953) is a Trinidadian politician who was the fifth President of Trinidad and Tobago, from 2013 to 2018. Previously he was a High Court Judge at the Supreme Court of Trinidad and Tobago, and he served as a Judge of the International Criminal Court from 2012 to 2013.

Early life and education

Anthony Carmona was born on 7 March 1953 in Fyzabad, in South Trinidad, eldest of six children of Dennis Stephen and Barbara Carmona. He is of African, Mestizo and Cocoa Panyol descent. He graduated from Santa Flora Government Primary School and Presentation College, San Fernando. He attended the University of the West Indies and the Hugh Wooding Law School between 1973 and 1983.

Career

After graduating from Hugh Wooding Law School in 1983, Carmona worked as a State Counsel. In 1989, he became a Senior State Attorney. From 1994 to 1999, he was first Assistant then Deputy Director of Public Prosecutions. From 2001 to 2004, he was an Appeals Counsel at the Office of the Prosecutor at the International Criminal Tribunal for the Former Yugoslavia in The Hague the International Criminal Tribunal for Rwanda in Arusha.
Carmona  received  World Peace Culture Award on 4 May 2019.

High Court Judge

In 2004, he was appointed a High Court Judge at the Supreme Court of Trinidad and Tobago.

International Criminal Court

On 12 December 2011, he was elected as a judge of the International Criminal Court. He won the office in the first ballot in the Assembly of States Parties with 72 of 104 votes; 70 votes were needed. Carmona took office on 11 March 2012.

President of Trinidad and Tobago

Nomination

On 3 February 2013, Prime Minister Kamla Persad-Bissessar announced that the ruling party would nominate Carmona to succeed outgoing President George Maxwell Richards. The following day, Keith Rowley, leader of the opposition People's National Movement, indicated that his party supported Carmona's nomination. However, following this announcement, the People's National Movement questioned Carmona's eligibility to serve as President, given his work outside the country between 2001 and 2004. (To be eligible to be elected president, a person must be "ordinarily resident" in the country for the ten years prior to election.) Attorney General Anand Ramlogan responded by saying that the government had consulted with legal experts who expressed the opinion that Carmona met this requirement.

References

External links

 

1953 births
Cocoa panyols
International Criminal Court judges
Living people
Presidents of Trinidad and Tobago
Trinidad and Tobago Roman Catholics
Trinidad and Tobago people of Spanish descent
21st-century Trinidad and Tobago judges
Trinidad and Tobago Senior Counsel
University of the West Indies alumni
20th-century Trinidad and Tobago  lawyers
21st-century Trinidad and Tobago politicians
People from Siparia region
Trinidad and Tobago judges of international courts and tribunals